The Translators is a 2019 French thriller film directed by .

Plot 

Dedalus is a best-seller trilogy whose last book is eagerly awaited. Nine translators are confined in a bunker, beneath a French manor, to work on it. Despite the secrecy, the first pages are leaked on the web.

Cast 
 Lambert Wilson: Éric Angstrom, the publisher
 Alex Lawther: Alex Goodman, the English translator
 Olga Kurylenko: Katerina Anisinova, the Russian translator
 Riccardo Scamarcio: Dario Farelli, the Italian translator
 Sidse Babett Knudsen: Helene Tuxen, the Danish translator
 Eduardo Noriega: Javier Casal, the Spanish translator
 : Ingrid Korbel, the German translator
 Frédéric Chau: Chen Yao, the Chinese translator
 Maria Leite: Telma Alves, the Portuguese translator
 Manolis Mavromatakis: Konstantinos Kedrinos, the Greek translator
 Sara Giraudeau: Rose-Marie Houeix, Éric Angstrom's assistant
 Patrick Bauchau: Georges Fontaine, the bookseller
 Sergueï Nesterenko: Marat
 Ilya Nikitenko: Ivan
 Miglen Mirtchev: Sergei
 Michel Bompoil: Robert Monteil 
 Nicolas Koretzky: Philippe Arthur 
 Vinciane Millereau: Carole Bauer 
 Jade Phan-Gia: Lucie Smadja 
 Marc Arnaud: Paul Sierra 
 Irina Muluile: Inspector Camara
 Stéphane Pézerat: Inspector Pulaski
 Kester Lovelace: British inspector
 Jacob Hauberg Lohmann: Helene Tuxen's husband
 Alasdair Noble: young Alex Goodman
 Suzana Joaquim Mausdlay: Lisbon Airport attendant

Trivia 
This movie was inspired by the unique translation operation of Dan Brown's Inferno in 2013, which was conceived to prevent leaking and "guarantee the simultaneous publication of the novel worldwide". The translators were divided into two groups and worked from Milan and London respectively. In 2017, the same operation was repeated for the translation of Origin, the fifth book in the Robert Langdon series, with 26 translators working together in Barcelona.

References

External links 

2019 thriller films
Films about books
Films about interpreting and translation
Films about murder
Films about writers
Films set in bunkers
Films set in Berlin
Films set in Copenhagen
Films set in Lisbon
Films set in London
Films set in Paris
Films set in prison
French films about revenge
French thriller films
2010s French-language films
2010s French films